The 2017 COSAFA Cup (known as Castle Lager COSAFA Cup South Africa 2017 for sponsorship reasons) is the 17th edition of the COSAFA Cup, an international football competition consisting of national teams of member nations of the Council of Southern Africa Football Associations (COSAFA).  It was held in South Africa from 25 June to 9 July.

Format

14 teams compete.

8 teams compete in the group stage:

 (invitee)

The teams are drawn into 2 groups of 4 teams. Each team plays each other team in its group once, earning 3 points for a win and 1 for a draw. The two group winners advance to the quarter-finals.

6 teams receive a bye to the quarter-finals:

The remainder of the tournament is straight knockout, with quarter-finals, semi-finals, a third place playoff and a final to decide the winners of the COSAFA Cup.

The four losing quarter-finalists compete for the Plate.

Venues

Draw

The draw was announced on 18 May 2017.

Group stage

Group A

Group B

Knockout stage

Quarter-finals

Semi-finals

Third-place playoff

Final

Plate

The losing quarter-finalists will qualify for this round.

Semi-finals

Final

Goalscorers
There have been 53 goals scored in 23 matches, for an average of  goals per match.

6 goals
 Ovidy Karuru

5 goals
 Knox Mutizwa

4 goals
 Ocean Mushure

3 goals

 Justin Shonga

2 goals

 Tojo Claudel Fanomezana
 Rinjala Raherinaivo
 Shiza Kichuya
 Simon Msuva
 Brian Mwila
 Talent Chawapiwa

1 goal

 Augusto Quibeto
 Kabelo Seakanyeng
 Tsoanelo Koetle
 Sera Motebang
 Mabuti Potloane
 Ranaivoson Ndrantoharilala
 Ardino Raveloarisona
 Kevin Perticots
 Arnaldo
 Joao Simango
 Stélio Teca
 Ronald Ketjijere
 Roddy Melanie
 Mohau Mokate
 Judas Moseamedi
 Riyaad Norodien
 Felix Badenhorst
 Elias Maguri
 Erasto Nyoni
 Jackson Chirwa
 Lubinda Mundia
 Prince Dube
 Blessing Majarira

Awards

Player of the Tournament
 

Golden Boot 
  (6 goals)

Best Goalkeeper

References

External links
Official site

2017
2017 in African football
International association football competitions hosted by South Africa
2017 in South African sport
June 2017 sports events in Africa
July 2017 sports events in Africa